This is a list of software that provides an alternative graphical user interface for Microsoft Windows operating systems. The technical term for this interface is a shell. Windows' standard user interface is the  Windows shell; Windows 3.0 and Windows 3.1x have a different shell, called Program Manager. The programs in this list do not restyle the Windows shell, but replace it; therefore, they look and function differently, and have different configuration options.

See also
 Comparison of Start menu replacements for Windows 8
 Comparison of X Window System desktop environments
 Desktop environment
 History of the graphical user interface
 Microsoft Bob
 Removal of Internet Explorer

References

External links
 

Desktop shell replacement
Windows-only software
Computing-related lists